South Park and Philosophy may be one of three books:
South Park and Philosophy: Bigger, Longer, and More Penetrating, by Richard Hanley, 2007
South Park and Philosophy: You Know, I Learned Something Today, by Robert Arp, 2006
(The Ultimate) South Park and Philosophy: Respect My Philosophah!, by Robert Arp, 2013